The 2018 Brisbane Darts Masters was the inaugural staging of the tournament by the Professional Darts Corporation, as a sixth and final entry in the 2018 World Series of Darts. The tournament featured 16 players (eight PDC players facing eight regional qualifiers) and was held at the BCEC in Brisbane from 17–19 August 2018.

Rob Cross became the inaugural champion in Brisbane, after defeating Michael van Gerwen 11–6 in the final.

Prize money
The total prize fund was £60,000.

Qualifiers
The eight invited PDC representatives, (seeded according to the 2018 World Series of Darts Order of Merit) are:

  Peter Wright (semi-finals)
  Michael van Gerwen (runner-up)
  Gary Anderson (quarter-finals)
  Rob Cross (champion)
  Michael Smith (first round)
  Raymond van Barneveld (semi-finals)
  Simon Whitlock (first round)
  Kyle Anderson (quarter-finals)

The regional qualifiers are:

Draw

References

Brisbane Darts Masters
Brisbane Darts Masters
World Series of Darts
Sport in Brisbane
Brisbane Darts Masters